Pygmalion is a 1935 German comedy film directed by Erich Engel and starring Jenny Jugo, Gustaf Gründgens and Anton Edthofer. It is based on George Bernard Shaw's 1913 play Pygmalion.

The basic plot consists of a professor's attempts to transform an uneducated flower seller into a proper lady.

The film's sets were designed by the art director Emil Hasler and Arthur Schwarz.

Cast
 Jenny Jugo as Eliza Doolittle
 Gustaf Gründgens as Professor Higgins
 Anton Edthofer as Oberst Pickering 
 Eugen Klöpfer as Alfred Doolittle 
 Hedwig Bleibtreu as Mrs. Higgins 
 Käthe Haack as Mrs. Pearce 
 Olga Limburg as Mrs. Hill 
 Karin Evans as Klara Hill 
 Vivigenz Eickstedt as Freddy Hill 
 Erika Glässner as Betsy 
 Hans Richter as Jonny 
 Erna Morena
 Werner Pledath
 Josef Dahmen
 Ernst Behmer
 Erich Dunskus
 Oskar Höcker
 Wera Schultz

References

Bibliography

External links
 

1935 films
Films of Nazi Germany
1935 romantic comedy films
German black-and-white films
German films based on plays
Films based on works by George Bernard Shaw
Films set in London
1930s German-language films
Films directed by Erich Engel
German romantic comedy films
1930s German films